Herman Otto Hartley (born Hermann Otto Hirschfeld in Berlin, Germany; 1912–1980) was a German American statistician. He made significant contributions in many areas of statistics, mathematical programming, and optimization. He also founded Texas A&M University's Department of Statistics.

Hartley's earliest papers appeared under the name H.O. Hirschfeld. His father having been born in England, Hartley had dual nationality. He cleverly translated his German last name Hirschfeld (Hirsch = Hart, Feld = field = lea = ley) into English.

Career 
In 1934, at the age of 22, Hartley earned a Ph.D. in mathematics from the University of Berlin, followed by a Ph.D. in mathematical statistics from the University of Cambridge in 1940 and a Doctorate of Science in mathematical statistics from University College London in 1954. He began his independent academic career at UCL, where he met Egon Pearson, with whom he collaborated to produce the classic two-volume Biometrika Tables for Statisticians, and also developed Hartley's F-max test for equality of variances.

A one-year Visiting Research Professor in Statistics position at then-Iowa State College brought Hartley to the United States in 1953 and to the forefront of a major statistics program. The position was extended after that initial year to include nine more years, during which he became deeply involved in research and teaching. His early computational talent enabled him to play a prominent part in instituting computing both for scientific and administrative purposes at Iowa State, which for the first time had university-wide service in data processing and numerical analysis. He also was a remarkably active consultant on statistics to a wide variety of scientists on campus.

After a decade at Iowa State, Hartley came to Texas A&M University, where he was appointed in 1963 as a distinguished professor and founding director of the Institute of Statistics. He was tasked with leading the Graduate Institute of Statistics, which had been formed a year earlier with only a handful of faculty, two graduate students, and the lofty mandate of providing statistical research, consulting, and instruction for all of Texas A&M University. In the ensuing decade and a half, he built his initial faculty of four into a group of 16, directed more than 30 doctoral students, and attracted significant research funding.

Hartley was short in stature, and in giving lectures, he would often begin with an audience icebreaker, asking, "Can you hear me? Can you see me?" He brought many distinguished statisticians to Texas A&M during his tenure, including Pearson, a slight man of "considerable height" who towered above Hartley when standing side by side, earning him the classic introduction from Hartley: "Never were there two more appropriate statisticians to work on the concept of range statistics."

Hartley remained active at Texas A&M until 1979, when he accepted a full-time visiting professor position at Duke University while also serving as statistician with the National Testing Service in Durham, N.C., until his death on December 30, 1980.

Hartley was an elected fellow of the Institute of Mathematical Statistics (1949) and the American Statistical Association (1953) as well as an elected member of the International Statistical Institute (1954). He served as president of the Eastern North American Region of the Biometric Society (1959), which was the first region formed in the present-day International Biometric Society, and as president of the American Statistical Association (1979). During his lifetime, Hartley earned many accolades for his contributions to mathematics and statistics, including the ASA's 1973 Samuel S. Wilks Medal recognizing his national and international efforts in the field of statistics.

Research 
A prolific author, Hartley published nearly 100 papers (three-quarters of them during the final two decades of his career) in top-tiered journals until his mandatory retirement in 1977. 

Hartley's most well-known work includes:

 Biometrika Tables for Statisticians with E. Pearson in 1954 and 1972
 The origination of the EM Algorithm methodology while at Iowa State in 1958.  Today it is one of the most widely used estimation methods.
 Hartley’s F-max Test for equality of variances

He also made pioneering contributions to:

 Politz-Simmons Estimator, which is a method for dealing with bias due to “not at home” entries in survey sampling.
 Hartley-Ross Estimator, which aims to estimate the mean of finite population of size N with the help of a known mean of a correlated variable. Unbiasedness proved and variance given.
 RHC Sampling Scheme, which estimates the population total using an unequal-probability sampling without replacement from a finite population
 Correspondence analysis, which is similar to principal component analysis but as applied to categorical data.

Hartley's other research spanned a variety of ground-breaking topics, including:

 Sample survey estimation and design 
 Mathematical optimization 
 Variance component estimation 
 Stochastic PERT 
 The development of designed experiments to estimate safe doses of carcinogenic agents

Legacy 
Through his passion for mathematics and statistics, amiable demeanor, and lively energy, Hartley won the hearts of his colleagues and students, who affectionately referred to him as HOH. Widely regarded as not only a brilliant academician, but also a warm and caring human being, Hartley was deeply committed to all phases of his profession, including education, research, and delivery of knowledge and advice to users of statistics.

Hartley's legacy at Texas A&M continues to unfold via the H.O. Hartley Award presented annually for the past 40 years to a statistics former student who best reflects Hartley's tradition of distinguished service to the discipline, the biannual Hartley Memorial Lecture Series also named in his honor, and the H.O. Hartley Chair in Statistics, established in July 2019 by his students and the Thomas W. Powell '62 Endowed Graduate Fellowship Fund.

References

1912 births
1980 deaths
American statisticians
Fellows of the American Statistical Association
Presidents of the American Statistical Association
20th-century American mathematicians
German emigrants to the United States
Academics of University College London
Mathematical statisticians